First Artists was a production company which operated from 1969 to 1980. It made films for stars such as Barbra Streisand, Paul Newman, Sidney Poitier, Dustin Hoffman and Steve McQueen, who agreed to take lesser fees in exchange for greater creative control and a share of the profits. Movies made by the company include The Getaway and its most successful financial success, Streisand's A Star Is Born.

History

Beginnings
The company was formed in 1969 and was the idea of agent Freddie Fields of Creative Management with assistance from David Begelman.  Inspired by the formation of United Artists, it was to give stars more creative control over their productions in exchange for being paid lower salaries and a percentage of the gross. The initial stars who formed the company were Paul Newman, Barbra Streisand, and Sidney Poitier. Each star promised to make three productions for the company, which would also be involved in television production, music publishing and recording. The distributor of the films would be National General Pictures who would put up two-thirds of the money for a film, and First Artists would put up the rest.

In July 1970 Patrick Kelly was appointed chief executive officer of First Artists. The following year Steve McQueen joined the company.

The company's first slate of films were  Pocket Money (1972) with Newman, The Getaway (1972) with McQueen, The Life and Times of Judge Roy Bean (1972) with Newman, and Up the Sandbox (1972) with Streisand. The Getaway and Roy Bean were particularly successful.

In 1972 First Artists offered 350,000 shares to investors at $7.50. That year Dustin Hoffman joined the company agreeing to make two films at no more than $3 million. He would have creative control provided the film did not go over budget and schedule.

National General eventually went into liquidation. First Artists sued the company, and settled in 1976. In November 1973 Warners took over the distribution of First Artists movies.

Phil Feldman
The company's initial output was sporadic, owing to the commitments of its stars and by January 1975 it had only made seven films. That month, Phil Feldman, formerly a producer and an executive at CBS, Rastar and Warner Brothers, was brought in as chairman. He increased the development slate, and moved it into film distribution, television and music to ensure a more constant source of income.

Feldman decided to supplement the company's movies with other star's films, such as Bobby Deerfield, originally developed for Paul Newman, and made with Al Pacino at Columbia. They were involved in the production of The Gumball Rally, were distribution consultants on The Ritz and did TV movies like Minstrel Man.

In July 1977 Feldman announced that Bill Cosby, who had appeared in three Poitier films, would produce and star in a film for the company called Sitting Pretty. "I consider him a member of the team," said Feldman of Cosby. Other films the company planned to make include Repo with Darren McGavin and Stevie with Glenda Jackson and Devilfish with Bert Gordon. (Devilfish and Sitting Pretty would ultimately not be made.) They shared development costs on Bobby Deerfield, The Gauntlet and The One and Only and co produced Speedtrap with a Dutch conglomerate. The company also distributed some foreign films in the USA such as Pardon Mon Affaire and That Obscure Object of Desire.

McQueen made Enemy of the People which was a box office disappointment. When First Artists refused to option Harold Pinter's Old Times for McQueen, the actor sued the company. The case was settled out of court.

Feldman insisted that Hoffman not make pictures for other studios until his obligation to First Artists was completed. Hoffman wound up suing First Artists for $65 million claiming that he was denied creative control on Straight Time and Agatha. Feldman counter claimed that these movies had gone over budget and schedule, allowing him to step in.

In July 1978 the company acquired Joel/Cal-Made, a male clothing manufacturer for $8 million. In November the company sought to buy into a London casino but was unsuccessful.

End of Company
Films such as Straight Time and Agatha performed poorly at the box office, although The Main Event was very successful. In September 1979 Philip Feldman resigned as chairman and president. The company was put up for sale.

On December 31, 1979, the voting trust that ran First Artists on behalf of its founder‐shareholders expired and First Artists left the movie business. By this stage the company's shares were worth $4. The company's last film was Tom Horn. The company closed down a year later in March 1980 and was sold to Warner Bros.

Select filmography

National General
Pocket Money (Feb 1972) - with Newman
The Getaway (Dec 1972) - with McQueen
The Life and Times of Judge Roy Bean (Dec 1972)- with Newman
Up the Sandbox (Dec 1972) - with Streisand
A Warm December (May 1973) - with Poitier

Warner Bros
Uptown Saturday Night (Jun 1974) - with Poitier
The Drowning Pool (Jul 1975) - with Newman
Let's Do It Again (Oct 1975) - with Poitier
The Gumball Rally (Aug 1976)
A Star Is Born (Dec 1976) - with Streisand
Bobby Deerfield (Sep 1977)
A Piece of the Action (Oct 1977) - with Poitier
Straight Time (Mar 1978) - with Hoffman
An Enemy of the People (Mar 1978) - with McQueen
Agatha (Feb 1979) - with Hoffman
The Main Event (Jun 1979) - with Streisand
Tom Horn (Mar 1980) - with McQueen

TV Movies
Flight to Holocaust (1977) (TV film)
Minstrel Man (1977) (TV film)
The Paul Williams Show (1979) (TV special)

First Artists Distributed
Speedtrap (1977)
Snatch (1978)
Stevie (1978)
Zero to Sixty (1978)

Distributor Only
Pardon Mon Affaire
That Obscure Object of Desire.

Unmade Projects
Dry Hustle from novel by Sarah Kernochan (1977)
Fancy Hardware by script by A. Carothers (1977)
Ev'ry Time We Say Goodbye based on the song by Cole Porter (1977)
Tramps an original script by Sandor Stern (1977)
Flashpoint based on novel by George LaFountaine

References

External links
First Artists at BFI

First Artists films